Jan Scherrer (born 11 July 1994) is a Swiss snowboarder. He is a three-time Olympian, representing Switzerland at the 2014 Winter Olympics in Sochi, the 2018 Winter Olympics in Pyongchang and the 2022 Winter Olympics in Beijing. He placed third to win the bronze medal at the 2022 Beijing Winter Olympics.

References

External links

1994 births
Snowboarders at the 2014 Winter Olympics
Snowboarders at the 2018 Winter Olympics
Snowboarders at the 2022 Winter Olympics
Living people
Olympic snowboarders of Switzerland
Swiss male snowboarders
People from Toggenburg
X Games athletes
Medalists at the 2022 Winter Olympics
Olympic bronze medalists for Switzerland
Olympic medalists in snowboarding
Sportspeople from the canton of St. Gallen
21st-century Swiss people